Several ships have been named Madagascar, for the island of Madagascar:

  was a large British merchant ship built for the trade to India and China that disappeared on a voyage from Melbourne to London in 1853. 
  was a paddle steamer that served the British Empire as a troop transport in the First Opium War, during which conflict an accidental fire destroyed her.

See also

Ship names